is a national highway connecting Kobe and Tokushima in Japan. It is the only national highway that traverses Awaji Island as the route uses ferries to connect the two cities of Naruto, Tokushima and Akashi, Hyōgo.

Route data
Length: 85.7 km (53.5 mi)
Origin: Chuo-ku, Kobe
Terminus: Tokushima (ends at the origin of Routes 11 and 55)
Major cities: Akashi, Awaji, Sumoto, Minamiawaji, Naruto

History
4 December 1952 - First Class National Highway 28 (from Kobe to Tokushima)
1 April 1965 - General National Highway 28 (from Kobe to Tokushima)

Intersects with

Hyogo Prefecture
Tokushima Prefecture

References

028
Roads in Hyōgo Prefecture
Roads in Tokushima Prefecture